The 60th Brigade was a formation of British Army. It was part of the new army also known as Kitchener's Army. It was assigned to the 20th (Light) Division and served on the Western Front during the First World War.

Formation
 
6th Battalion, Oxfordshire and Buckinghamshire Light Infantry
6th Battalion, King's Shropshire Light Infantry
12th Battalion, King's Royal Rifle Corps
12th Battalion, Rifle Brigade
60th Machine Gun Company
60th Trench Mortar Battery

References

Infantry brigades of the British Army in World War I